Los Chunguitos are a Spanish Romani rumba flamenca group from Badajoz, Extremadura, formed in Vallecas, Madrid in 1973.

The group's nucleus was the three brothers Juan (1954), Manuel (1962), and José Salazar (1957), whose uncle was the flamenco singer Porrina de Badajoz. Their sisters, Toñi and Encarna, sang backup and would later go on to success on their own as Azúcar Moreno.

The name "Los Chunguitos" comes from the pastime of throwing small stones at trains. They began as street buskers, playing in Madrid. In 1977, they auditioned at the offices of record label EMI, and producer Raul Ros convinced the label to sign them. They became hitmakers both in their own country and across Europe with songs such as "Dame veneno". They also appeared in the soundtracks to films such as Deprisa, Deprisa, Perros callejeros, and Días contados.

The group plays rumba flamenca influenced by Romani music and Catalan rumba. Their lyrics often touch on poverty and misfortune.

Discography
 1977 - Los Chunguitos
 1978 - Vive Gitano
 1979 - Limosna de amor
 1980 - Pa ti pa tu primo
 1981 - Sangre caliente
 1982 - Barrio
 1983 - Recuerdo de Enrique
 1983 - Callejón sin salida
 1984 - Vagando por ahí
 1985 - Contra la pared
 1986 - Después de la tormenta
 1988 - Vive a tu manera (En Directo)
 1989 - Tiempos dificiles
 1990 - Baila con los Chunguitos
 1991 - Plaza vieja
 1992 - De pura sangre
 1993 - ¡Marcha!
 1993 - Noche de rumba
 1995 - Zoraida
 1996 - ¡Pa reventar!
 1999 - Auténtico
 2001 - La medalla
 2003 - Morir de amor
 2004 - Abre tu corazón
 2006 - Buena suerte
 2008 - La vida sigue (como Hermanos Salazar-Ex. Chunguitos)
 2012 - Se escapa
 2017 - Gavilán (Single)
 2017-2018 - Dame veneno (Los Chunguitos y Lydia Lozano, Gustavo González, Patricia González)

Compilations
 1980 - Lo mejor de los Chunguitos
 1984 - Cara a cara
 1986 - Grandes éxitos
 1992 - Pasión Gitana (1974-1992)
 1997 - Por el aire va
 2000 - Hoy-Sus 30 mejores canciones
 2001 - Grandes éxitos
 2004 - La rumba es nuestra (1973-2004)
 2005 - Todo Chunguitos
 2007 - Colección diamante
 2015 - Canción dedicada al gol de James

References

Rumba flamenca
Spanish musical groups
Musical groups established in 1973